Directorate General of Civil Aviation or Directorate General of Civil Aeronautics can refer to:

 Directorate General of Civil Aviation (Chile) ,the national civil aviation authority of Chile
 Directorate General of Civil Aviation (India), the national civil aviation authority of India
 Directorate General of Civil Aviation (Indonesia), the national civil aviation authority of Indonesia
 Directorate General of Civil Aeronautics (Mexico), the national civil aviation authority of Mexico
 Directorate General of Civil Aviation (Turkey), the national civil aviation authority of Turkey
 Dirección General de Aeronáutica Civil (disambiguation), Spanish for "Directorate General of Civil Aeronautics" and the name of the national civil aviation authority of various Spanish-speaking countries 
 Dirección General de Aviación Civil (disambiguation), Spanish for "Directorate General of Civil Aviation" and the name of the national civil aviation authority of various Spanish-speaking countries

See also
 Directorate General for Civil Aviation (France)
 List of civil aviation authorities